, formerly , is a subsidiary of  NEC Corp. It is headquartered in Kōtō, Tokyo, Japan, and specialized in information and communication technology systems building and maintenance.

NEC Solution Innovators provides its services to government agencies (municipalities), private companies, and other companies of  NEC Group.

The company was founded in 1975 as a specialized IT service provider for the NEC group. It has grown into a parent company of its own, owning a few branches inside Japan and three overseas child companies: NEC Soft Beijing, NEC Soft Jinan, and NEC Solutions Vietnam.

The company was listed on Tokyo Stock Exchange and trading its own stocks until 2005, when re-organization by NEC group made it wholly owned by its parent company.

Information technology companies of Japan
NEC subsidiaries